Zhang Chong ( born November 25, 1987) is a professional Chinese footballer who currently plays as a goalkeeper for Dalian Professional in the Chinese Super League.

Club career
At the beginning of the 2005 Chinese Super League season Zhang Chong would break into the senior team of Dalian Shide F.C. after graduating from their youth team. He would, however have to wait until the 2009 Chinese Super League season before he made his senior debut appearance for Dalian against Qingdao Jonoon on October 31, 2009 in the last game of the season in a 3-1 defeat. For the next two seasons he would then become the second choice goalkeeper behind Sun Shoubo as Dalian finished as mid-table regulars until the 2012 Chinese Super League saw Dalian have difficult start to the season and the manager Nelo Vingada decided to promote Zhang as the club's first choice goalkeeper in a league game on March 24, 2012 in a 2-1 victory against Qingdao Jonoon.

Before the start of the 2013 Chinese Super League season the club would go through a protracted acquisition from local top tier rivals Dalian Yifang (now named Dalian Professional). He would make his debut for them in a league game on 16 March 2013 against Qingdao Jonoon in a 1-0 defeat. He would go on to establish himself as an integral member of the squad, however the following season would see him be part of the team that was relegated at the end of the 2014 Chinese Super League campaign. He would remain loyal towards the club and go on to eventually help guide the club to win the division and promotion at the end of the 2017 China League One campaign.

Career statistics
.

Honours

Club
Dalian Yifang/ Dalian Professional
China League One: 2017.

References

External links
Player profile at Dalian Shide F.C. website

Player stats at Sohu.com

1987 births
Living people
Chinese footballers
Footballers from Dalian
Dalian Shide F.C. players
Dalian Professional F.C. players
Chinese Super League players
China League One players
Association football goalkeepers